The Embassy of Eritrea in London is the diplomatic mission of Eritrea in the United Kingdom & Ireland. The embassy is located at 96 White Lion Street, London N1 9PF, in the London Borough of Islington.

As of 2022, the Ambassador is H.E. Estifanos Habtemariam.

Gallery

References

External links
Official site

Diplomatic missions in London
Diplomatic missions of Eritrea
Eritrea–United Kingdom relations
Buildings and structures in Islington